Manika is a 1986 socio-mythological Odia-language Indian feature film directed by R. Asrar. The film depicts the legendary story of one of the devotees of Lord Jagannath, Manika the milkmaid.

Plot
Manika, a milkmaid (Gauduni) and orphan girl, is a devotee of the Lord Jagannath, convinced that one day she will get a glimpse of the Lord and ultimately attain Moksha: freedom from the endless cycle of transmigration into a state of bliss.

After defeat in the famous Kanchi expedition, the Gajapati of Kalinga now Odisha, India prays Lord Jagannath and moved with the prayer Lorg Jagannath along with his brother Lord Balabhadra started expedition to Kanchi on horse-back. On the banks of Mahanadi, they reach to Manika, who is selling curd. Both the Gods drink curd and presented a golden ring studded with precious gems to Manika and  said, 'the king of Kalinga' will come here, after some time, on his way to Kanchi. You present it to him and he will pay you the money. Later, the king  himself passed by with his army. Milkmaid Manika obstructed the Gajapati pleading for the unpaid cost of yogurt consumed by Gajapati's two leading soldiers riding on black and white horses and produced the gold ring as evidence. Gajapati  identified the ring as that of Lord Jagannath and upon the divine support, enthusiastically led the expedition. Manika is in a state of disbelief and she finally get glimpse of the God. Her ambition of the lifetime fulfilled. She decide to devote her rest of life in the prayer of lord  Jagannath.

Cast
Tandra Ray as Manika
Bijay Mohanty as Chandra Behera
Gurudatta Samantsinhar as Lord Jagannath
Gita Datta
Gadi
Premananda Mohanty

Music
The music of the film composed by Upendra Kumar.
The tracks from the film include:

References

External links
 

1986 films
Films set in Odisha
1980s Odia-language films